Fotbalový stadion Josefa Masopusta is a multi-use stadium in Most, Czech Republic.  It is currently used mostly for football matches and is the home ground of FK Baník Most.  The stadium has an all-seated capacity of 7,500 people.

References
 Photo gallery and data at Erlebnis-stadion.de

Football venues in the Czech Republic
FK Baník Most
1961 establishments in Czechoslovakia
Sports venues completed in 1961
20th-century architecture in the Czech Republic